The Landsmannschaft der Banater Schwaben e.V. ("Territorial Association of Banat Swabians", "Homeland Association of Banat Swabians") is an organization of German Banat Swabians refugees expelled from their homes in Banat, Romania after World War II.

The organization is based in Munich, and it was founded in 1950.

See also 
Expulsion of Germans after World War II
Federation of Expellees
Flight and expulsion of Germans (1944–1950)
Banat Swabians

External links 
 Official website

Landsmannschaften